Silam was a federal constituency in Sabah, Malaysia, that has been represented in the Dewan Rakyat from 1974 to 2019.

The federal constituency was created in the 1974 redistribution and is mandated to return a single member to the Dewan Rakyat under the first past the post voting system.

History
It was abolished in 2019 when it was redistributed

Representation history

State constituency

Election results

References

Defunct Sabah federal constituencies